The 1989–90 season was the 79th season in Hajduk Split’s history and their 44th in the Yugoslav First League. Their 3rd place finish in the 1988–89 season meant it was their 44th successive season playing in the Yugoslav First League.

Competitions

Overall

Yugoslav First League

Classification

Results summary

Results by round

Matches

Yugoslav First League

Sources: hajduk.hr

Yugoslav Cup

Sources: hajduk.hr

Player seasonal records

Top scorers

Source: Competitive matches

Notes
1. Data for league attendance in most cases reflects the number of sold tickets and may not be indicative of the actual attendance.

See also
1989–90 Yugoslav First League
1989–90 Yugoslav Cup

References

External sources
 1989–90 Yugoslav First League at rsssf.com
 1989–90 Yugoslav Cup at rsssf.com

HNK Hajduk Split seasons
Hajduk Split